The college football recruiting class of 2019 refers to the recruiting of high school athletes to play college football starting in the fall of 2019. The scope of this article covers: (a) the colleges and universities with recruiting classes ranking among the top 20 in the country as assessed by at least one of the major media companies, and (b) the individual recruits ranking among the top 20 in the country as assessed by at least one of the major media companies.

Top ranked classes

Top ranked recruits

References

Recruiting class